CFL Class 2300 is a series of electric multiple units of the type Stadler KISS built by Stadler Rail for the Luxembourgian national railway company, CFL.

In 2010, CFL ordered 8 double-decker EMUs for 60 million euros for the Luxembourg – Koblenz line.

From 10 December 2018, CFL started to operate the Class 2300 on a once-a-day service each way between Luxembourg and Düsseldorf Hbf via the West Rhine Railway. Due to its speed, this service is classed as an InterCity (IC) service from Koblenz Hbf to Düsseldorf Hbf.

Gallery

References

External links 
 Series 2300 on rail.lu 

2300
Stadler KISS
Stadler Rail rolling stock
25 kV AC multiple units
15 kV AC multiple units